Jamshid Amouzegar (‎; 25 June 1923 – 27 September 2016) was an Iranian economist and politician who was prime minister of Iran from 7 August 1977 to 27 August 1978 when he resigned. Prior to that, he served as the minister of interior and minister of finance in the cabinet of Amir-Abbas Hoveida. He was the leader of Rastakhiz Party during his tenure as prime minister of Iran.

Early life and education
Jamshid was born on 25 June 1923 in Tehran, Persia. He graduated from Tehran University with degrees in law and engineering. before attending Cornell University and receiving a Ph.D.

Career
Amouzegar served as deputy minister in Iran's ministry of health under Jahanshah Saleh in 1955. In 1959 Amouzegar replaced Hassan Akhavi as agriculture minister when Akhavi was removed from the cabinet of Prime Minister Manouchehr Eghbal. He was appointed minister of labor and then minister of health in the cabinet led by Prime Minister Hasan-ali Mansour. He subsequently became minister of finance in the cabinet of Amir Abbas Hoveida after the assassination of Prime Minister Mansour in 1964, remaining in that post for nine years. From 1965 to 1974 he headed several ordinary meetings of the OPEC. In 1971, he and Saudi Oil Minister Ahmed Zaki Yamani were instrumental in implementing the series of price hikes that ultimately quadrupled the price of oil and provided the resources for Iran to modernize its infrastructure, agriculture, and defense. For this accomplishment, Amouzegar was awarded the Taj-e Iran, first-class, an honor normally reserved for only the prime minister and former prime ministers. He was appointed minister of interior in 1974. On 21 December 1975 he was taken hostage by the Venezuelan terrorist Carlos the Jackal during an OPEC meeting. Carlos was ordered to execute him but did not do so, and Amouzegar was released along with the other hostages after a few days. Carlos flew him and a Saudi to Algeria. From there, they were released. 

In 1977 he became chairman of the Rastakhiz Party (Resurrection), having led the progressive faction against finance minister Hushang Ansary's liberal constructionist faction. Soon after Jimmy Carter became president of the United States, Amouzegar was appointed Prime Minister of Iran on 7 August 1977, succeeding Amir Abbas Hoveyda in the post. However, he rapidly became unpopular as he attempted to slow the overheated economy with measures that, although generally thought necessary, triggered a downturn in employment and private sector profits that would later compound the government's problems. He resigned and was replaced by Jafar Sharif-Emami on 27 August 1978.

Later years and death
Amouzegar did not return to Iran after leaving in 1978. He lived in Chevy Chase, Maryland and later in Rockville. Amouzegar was also a consultant to the governments of Saudi Arabia and Kuwait.

He died in Rockville, Maryland in the United States on 27 September 2016 at age of 93.

References

Sources

 'Alí Rizā Awsatí. Iran in the Past Three Centuries (Irān dar Se Qarn-e Goz̲ashteh - Volume 2 (Paktāb Publishing, Tehran, Iran, 2003). .
 Qajar (Kadjar) Orders and Decorations

1923 births
2016 deaths
Politicians from Tehran
University of Tehran alumni
Cornell University College of Engineering alumni
Prime Ministers of Iran
Finance ministers of Iran
Interior Ministers of Iran
Rastakhiz Party Secretaries-General
Exiles of the Iranian Revolution in the United States
Iranian emigrants to the United States
People of the Iranian Revolution
Iran Novin Party politicians
20th-century Iranian engineers
20th-century Iranian politicians